Pydna–Kolindros (Pýdna-Kolindrós) is a municipality in the Pieria regional unit, Central Macedonia, Greece. The seat of the municipality is the town Aiginio. The municipality has an area of 339.525 km2.

Municipality

The municipality Pydna–Kolindros was formed at the 2011 local government reform by the merger of the following 3 former municipalities, that became municipal units:
Aiginio
Kolindros
Methoni
Pydna

References

Municipalities of Central Macedonia
Populated places in Pieria (regional unit)